Banfield is a nightly American television news program on NewsNation, which premiered on March 1, 2021. The hourlong program hosted by Ashleigh Banfield is inspired by Larry King Live. The program airs weekdays at 10 p.m. ET and re-airs at 2 a.m. ET with rebroadcasts on the weekend.

Format 
Banfield stated that Banfield would generally focus on one guest for an hour and focus on having a "conversation" without interrogatory questions. The original first guest was to be Larry King until he died. At interviews prior to launch, Banfield said that she would attempt to seek out "thought leaders" from all over the political spectrum and promised "fact-based, unbiased journalism" that would prioritize the "health of the viewer." The first week of guests included Aaron Sorkin, Bryan Cranston, Robin Wright, and Keith Olbermann. However, other shows may have multiple guests depending on items in the news. The program is broadcast from a studio in Connecticut.

Episodes

Reception 
Despite promotion on the over 100 Nexstar Media Group stations as well as on NewsNation, ratings for Banfield have been low. The premiere episode with Aaron Sorkin had 17,000 viewers with 5,000 in the 25-54 demographic prized by advertisers. This was 38% fewer viewers and 50% fewer viewers in the 25-54 age group than the hour of NewsNation Prime it replaced.

References

External links

 

2020s American television news shows
2021 American television series debuts
Nexstar Media Group
English-language television shows